Matt Willhite (born July 23, 1971) is a Democratic politician from Florida who has served as a member of the Florida House of Representatives since 2016.  He represents the 86th District, which includes Greenacres, Haverhill, Loxahatchee Groves, Royal Palm Beach, Wellington and parts of unincorporated Palm Beach County.  Willhite currently works as a Captain for Palm Beach County Fire Rescue, making him the first active duty first responder serving in the history of the Florida Legislature.

History

Matt Willhite was born in Pontiac, Michigan and moved to Palm Beach County, Florida in 1980 at the age of 9. He graduated from Lake Worth High School. In 1999, Willhite enlisted in the United States Navy and served 8 years as a Corpsman, serving with the 4th ANGLICO of the United States Marine Corps.

Florida House of Representatives

When incumbent State Representative Mark Pafford was unable to seek re-election in 2016 due to term limits, Willhite ran to succeed him in the 86th District, which included Haverhill, Loxahatchee Groves, Royal Palm Beach, Wellington, and parts of Greenacres and West Palm Beach.

Willhite faced Tinu Pena in the Democratic primary. He placed first in the primary, winning 56.29% of the vote. Willhite then went on to defeat Republican challenger Laurel Bennett, with 57.59% of the vote. In 2017 Matt Willhite helped revive the non-partisan Veteran's caucus in the Florida Legislature and was elected chair.

Willhite was reelected in the November 6, 2018 general election, again defeating Bennett, this time with 59.82% of the vote.

During his second year in office, Willhite was elected as Vice Chair of the Palm Beach County Legislative Delegation, a group on 13 lawmakers who represent districts in Palm Beach County. In 2018, Willhite was elected as Chair of the Legislative Delegation.

References

Democratic Party members of the Florida House of Representatives
Living people
21st-century American politicians
Palm Beach State College alumni
People from Pontiac, Michigan
1971 births